DARTSLIVE The World (stylized as THE WORLD) is a series of soft-tip darts tournaments held annually in various venues around the world since 1985.

Overview

The World is a tournament series organized by Japanese soft-tip darts company Dartslive. It is also referenced as the Soft-Tip World Championship, although several other organisations have held tournaments with that name. Typically, a season consists of five to nine tournaments, called stages, which are broadcast via dartslive.tv. Usually, one stage is held in Europe and North America each, with the other tournaments set throughout East Asia. An annual ranking is composed of stage results during the season. In 2011–13, 2016, and 2018, a Grand Final has been held at the end of the year, with players being invited according to their ranking position, as well as, since 2016, a wild card tournament.

The World stages are open to both men and women, with a special award being given to the best female player at every event, the only exception being the 2016 (unranked) Premium Stage, where a separate women's event was staged. Matches are played in the formats 701-Master Out and Cricket.

The most recent Grand Final champion is Royden Lam, whereas the 2019 annual ranking has been won by Boris Krcmar. Previous seasons have been won by Ronald L. Briones (2011), Lourence Ilagan (2012), Paul Lim (2013, 2016–17), and Krcmar (2014–15, 2018).

The four best-placed players in the ranking are invited to the biannual Super Darts event in Japan

Grand Final champion Lim has been invited to the 2013 PDC World Darts Championship as part of a partnership between Dartslive and the Professional Darts Corporation. Lim also qualified to the 2014 PDC Worlds through the annual ranking.

Two steel tip World Champions have also won stages at The World: three-time World Champion John Part, and 2014 BDO World Champion Stephen Bunting. Many other PDC and BDO players have participated in The World events.

The 2019 stage in Hong Kong had been cancelled due to the 2019-20 Hong Kong protests.

Dartslive announced that in 2020, for the first time a stage would be held in Spain. However, due to the COVID-19 pandemic, the 2020 season was cancelled in its entirety.

Once travel and visitation restrictions were lifted in Japan in August 2022, DARTSLIVE announced a Premium Stage to be held later that month in Tokyo, and soon after a second premium stage to be held in Singapore at the end of November.

For 2023 DARTSLIVE announced there would be three events under ”The World” banner, but as stand alone events rather than having an annual ranking. The first stage was announced to be played on June 11, 2023 in Taichung, Taiwan. The remaining two stages are yet to be announced.

List of Stage finals

Records and statistics

(Players with minimum two The World stage titles)

References

External links 
 Official Website of THE WORLD 
 Official Website of Dartslive

1985 establishments in Japan
Darts tournaments